Chinese Canadians are Canadians of full or partial Chinese ancestry, which includes both naturalized Chinese immigrants and Canadian-born Chinese. They comprise a subgroup of East Asian Canadians which is a further subgroup of Asian Canadians. Demographic research tends to include immigrants from Mainland China, Taiwan, Hong Kong, and Macau, as well as overseas Chinese who have immigrated from Southeast Asia and South America into the broadly defined Chinese Canadian category.

Canadians who identify themselves as being of Chinese ethnic origin make up about 5.1% of the Canadian population, or about 1.77 million people according to the 2016 census.

While other Asian groups are growing rapidly in the country, the Chinese Canadian community fell slightly to 1.71 million, or 4.63% of the Canadian population, in the 2021 Canadian census.

The Chinese Canadian community is the second largest ethnic group of Asian Canadians, constituting approximately 40% of the Asian Canadian population. Most Canadians of Chinese descent are concentrated within the provinces of Ontario and British Columbia.

History

Pre-19th century
The first record of Chinese in what is known as Canada today can be dated back to 1788. The British fur trader John Meares hired a group of roughly 70 Chinese carpenters from Macau and employed them to build a ship, the North West America, at Nootka Sound, Vancouver Island, British Columbia. This was then an increasingly important but disputed European outpost on the Pacific coast, which, after Spanish seizure, was abandoned by Mears, leaving the eventual whereabouts of the carpenters largely unknown.

19th century 

Before 1885 and the completion of the Canadian Pacific Railway (CPR), access to British Columbia from other parts of Canada was difficult. The creation of a better transportation system was essential to integration of British Columbia into the new Confederation.

Chinese railway workers made up the labour force for construction of two one-hundred mile sections of the Canadian Pacific Railway from the Pacific to Craigellachie in the Eagle Pass in British Columbia. When British Columbia agreed to join Confederation in 1871, one of the conditions was that the Dominion government build a railway linking B.C. with eastern Canada within 10 years.  British Columbian politicians and their electorate agitated for an immigration program from the British Isles to provide this railway labour, but Prime Minister Sir John A. Macdonald, betrayed the wishes of his constituency (Victoria) by insisting the project cut costs by employing Chinese immigrants to build the railway, and summarized the situation this way to Parliament in 1882: "It is simply a question of alternatives: either you must have this labour or you can't have the railway." (British Columbian politicians had wanted a settlement-immigration plan for workers from the British Isles, but Canadian politicians and investors said it would be too expensive).

Chinese communities in Canada in the 19th and well into the 20th centuries were organized around the traditional kinship systems linking people belonging to the same clans together.
As not everyone in the Chinese communities necessarily belonged to the same clans, "voluntary" associations that functioned in many ways like guilds that provided social welfare, community events and a forum for politics became very important in Chinese-Canadian communities. Linking together all of the voluntary associations were Benevolent Associations that in effect ran the various Chinatowns in Canada, mediating disputes within the communities and providing for leaders who negotiated with Canadian politicians. As many Chinese immigrants knew little or no English, and most white Canadians did not welcome them, the Chinatowns tended to be cut off from the wider Canadian communities, functioning as "islands". The Canadian media in the late 19th and early 20th centuries depicted the Chinatowns in lurid and sensationalist terms as centres of "filth"; using the very poverty of the Chinese against them, Canadian newspapers frequently claimed that the Chinese immigrants were an innately dirty people who carried infectious diseases and were prone to criminality. Reflecting the popularity of "Yellow Peril" stereotypes, the media blamed Chinese immigrants for all the crime in Canada, depicting the Chinese as luring innocent white Canadians into gambling, prostitution and drug addiction.         

Many workers from Guangdong Province (mainly Taishanese people and Pearl River Delta peoples) arrived to help build the Canadian Pacific Railway in the 19th century as did Chinese veterans of the gold rushes. These workers accepted the terms offered by the Chinese labour contractors who were engaged by the railway construction company to hire them—low pay, long hours, lower wages than non-Chinese workers and dangerous working conditions, in order to support their families that stayed in China. Their willingness to endure hardship for low wages enraged fellow non-Chinese workers who thought they were unnecessarily complicating the labour market situations. Most of the Chinese immigrants in the 19th century spoke Cantonese and their term for Canada was Gum San. The name Gum San, which concerned a supposed gigantic mountain made of pure gold located somewhere in the Rockies, was not taken literally, but instead was a metaphor for the hopes of Chinese immigrants for greater wealth in Canada. Almost all of the Chinese immigrants in the 19th century were young men, with women staying behind in China with the hope of marrying a "Gold mountain guest" as those who made money in Canada usually returned to China. Unable to marry white women, many Chinese men in Canada married First Nations women as the Indian peoples were more willingly to accept them.

From the passage of the Chinese Immigration Act in 1885, the Canadian government began to charge a substantial head tax for each Chinese person trying to immigrate to Canada. The Chinese were the only ethnic group that had to pay such a tax. Owing to the fear of the "Yellow Peril", in 1895 the government of Mackenzie Bowell passed an act forbidding any Asian-Canadian to vote or hold office.

Early 20th century
In 1902, the Liberal Prime Minister Sir Wilfrid Laurier appointed a  Royal Commission on Chinese and Japanese Immigration, whose report stated that the Asians were "unfit for full citizenship ... obnoxious to a free community and dangerous to the state." Following the Royal Commission's report, Parliament voted to increase the Chinese head tax to $500 dollars, which temporarily caused Chinese immigration to Canada to stop. However, those Chinese wishing to go to Canada began to save up money to pay the head tax, which led to agitation, especially in British Columbia for the Dominion government to ban Asian immigration. Between September 7–9, 1907, an anti-Asian pogrom took place in Vancouver. The Asiatic Exclusion League organized attacks against homes and businesses owned by Chinese, Japanese, Korean and Indian immigrants under the slogan "White Canada Forever!"; though no one was killed, much property damage was done and numerous Asian-Canadians were beaten.

The 1907 pogrom was merely the most dramatic expression of the continuous agitation in Canada, especially in western Canada and among the working class, for the total exclusion of Asian immigration to Canada. In 1922, the feminist Emily Murphy published her best-selling book The Black Candle blaming Chinese and black immigrants for allegedly causing the problems of drug addiction among white Canadians. In 1923, the federal Liberal government of William Lyon Mackenzie King banned Chinese immigration with the passage of the Chinese Immigration Act of 1923, although numerous exemptions for businessmen, clergy, students and others did not end immigration entirely.  With this act, the Chinese received similar legal treatment to blacks before them who Canada also had specifically excluded from immigration on the basis of race. (This was formalised in 1911 by Prime Minister Sir Wilfrid Laurier who in Sub-section (c) of Section 38 of the Immigration Act called blacks "unsuitable" for Canada.)  During the next 25 years, more and more laws against the Chinese were passed. Most jobs were closed to Chinese men and women.  Many Chinese opened their own restaurants and laundry businesses. In British Columbia, Saskatchewan and Ontario, Chinese employers were not allowed to hire white females. Ernest Chewant Mark, an immigrant who arrived in Canada in 1908, emerged as one of the leading critics of the 1923 Exclusion Act, and worked closely with Senator William Proudfoot, a Presbyterian minister, into seeking to pressure the government to repeal the act.

Some of those Chinese-Canadian workers settled in Canada after the railway was constructed. Most could not bring the rest of their families, including immediate relatives, due to government restrictions and enormous processing fees. They established Chinatowns and societies in undesirable sections of the cities, such as Dupont Street (now East Pender) in Vancouver, which had been the focus of the early city's red-light district until Chinese merchants took over the area from the 1890s onwards. During the Great Depression, life was even tougher for the Chinese than it was for other Canadians. In Alberta, for example, Chinese Canadians received relief payments of less than half the amount paid to other Canadians. And because the Chinese Exclusion Act prohibited any additional immigration from China, the Chinese men who had arrived earlier had to face these hardships alone, without the companionship of their wives and children. Census data from 1931 shows that there were 1,240 men to every 100 women in Chinese Canadian communities. To protest the Chinese Exclusion Act, Chinese Canadians closed their businesses and boycotted Dominion Day celebrations every July 1, which became known as "Humiliation Day" by the Chinese Canadians. The film-maker Melinda Friedman stated about her interviews with Chinese Canadian veterans of World War II: "The thing that was the most shocking to me was hearing from the veterans ... describe what life was like in Vancouver as late as 1940, with the Ku Klux Klan living in Vancouver who were targeting, quite often, the Chinese community."

In 1937, when Japan attacked China, the government of Chiang Kai-shek asked for the overseas Chinese communities to support the homeland. From 1937 onward, the Chinese Canadian community regularly organized fund-raising events to raise money for China. By 1945, the Chinese Canadians had contributed $5 million Canadian dollars to China. Following the Xi'an Incident of December 1936, a "United Front" bringing together the Chinese Communist Party and the Kuomintang had been formed to resist Japanese aggression, which was soon put to the test when Japan invaded China in July 1937. Within the Chinese Canadian communities, a "United Front" atmosphere prevailed from the summer of 1937 on as various community leaders put aside their differences to focus on supporting China. Starting in 1937, a boycott was organized of Japanese goods, and Canadian businesses that sold war materials to Japan were subject of demonstrations. One of the main slogans used at the demonstrations was "Don't Kill Babies", a reference to the Imperial Japanese Army's habit of using Chinese infants for "bayonet practice".

Second World War 
The Second World War became the turning point in history of Chinese Canadians. To show support for the war, fund-raising events were held from September 1939 to raise money for the Canadian war effort, and by 1945, Chinese Canadians had purchased some $10 million worth of Victory Bonds. The Chinese community of Victoria was praised in a parliamentary resolution for being especially active in holding events to encourage people to buy Victory Bonds. In December 1941, Canada declared war on Japan, and from time onward, China was an ally, which helped to change white Canadian views.

The African American newspaper The Pittsburgh Courier called for the "double victory" or "Double V campaign" in a 1942 editorial, urging black Americans to work for victory over fascism abroad and racism at home.

 Though originally intended for black Americans, the slogan of "double victory" was taken up by Asian-American groups as well. The same slogan of "double victory" came to be embraced by Chinese Canadians. Despite not being allowed to vote or hold office, about 600 Chinese Canadians enlisted as "active" members to fight overseas (until late 1944 all Canadians serving abroad were volunteers). The prime minister, William Lyon Mackenzie King, did not want Chinese Canadians to serve in the military as he knew that veterans would demand the right to vote just as Chinese Canadian veterans had done after World War I, but strong pressure from the British Special Operations Executive, which needed Asian Canadians to work as agents who could go undercover in Japanese-occupied Asia, forced his hand.  Unlike in the First World War, where about 300 Chinese Canadians had served in the Canadian Expeditionary Force, this time Chinese Canadians serving in the Canadian military were given officers' commissions. All three services were reluctant to have Chinese Canadians given officers' commissions as having Asian men serving as officers giving orders to white men challenged the racial hierarchy. However, all those serving as airmen in the Royal Canadian Air Force (RCAF) were officers, and once Chinese Canadian airmen received officers' commissions, both the Army and the Navy were forced to follow suit. The RCAF was the service most open to Chinese Canadians because of the heavy losses taken in the bombing offensive against Germany. For RCAF, a 5% loss ratio was considered crippling and between March 5-June 24, 1943, the 6th Group of the RCAF lost 100 bombers in air raids over Germany, suffering a 7% loss ratio; altogether, 9,980 Canadians were killed in bombing raids against German cities between 1940–45, making the strategic bombing offensive one of the most costly operations for Canada in World War II.

In 1943, William Lore was commissioned as a lieutenant commander in the Royal Canadian Navy, becoming the first person of Chinese descent to be given an officer's commission in any of the Commonwealth navies. Lore was the first Allied officer to land in Hong Kong on August 30, 1945 and it he who announced to the surviving Canadian POWs, who had been held in barbaric conditions by the Japanese since surrendering on Christmas Day in 1941, being reduced down to "human skeletons", that they were now free men. Kam Hem Douglas Sam of the Royal Canadian Air Force, who had been serving on a Halifax bomber was shot down over France on June 28, 1944, and joined the French resistance, being awarded the Croix de Guerre from France after the war for his work with the resistance. Sam, who came from Victoria and could remember some French from high school, was able to pass himself off as a Vietnamese student in Reims. Sam first served with as a liaison with the Special Operations Executive (SOE) to organize landings of arms to the resistance from Britain. Sam later fought with the resistance, ambushing German troops on their way to Normandy. Flying Officer Quan Jil Louie of the RCAF was killed in early 1945 when his bomber was shot down over Germany. As Louie came from one of the more wealthier families of Vancouver's Chinatown, his death in action attracted much attention in Vancouver, and with it commentary he was not allowed to vote or hold office.

A number of Chinese Canadians were recruited by the SOE to serve in Japanese-occupied regions of China and Southeast Asia. About 150 Chinese Canadians served with the SOE Force 136 behind Japanese lines in Burma. Douglas Jung, who later become the first Chinese-Canadian MP, served as a SOE agent in Japanese-occupied Malaya in 1944–45, which was highly dangerous work as the Kenpeitai, the much feared Japanese military police, would give no mercy to any Allied agent whom they captured. Those serving with the Force 136 were given cyanide pills to take if faced with capture by the Japanese as it was known that any SOE agent captured by the Japanese would be tortured and killed. Another Chinese Canadian, Bill Chong, served with the British Army Aid Group in Hong Kong and southern China, smuggling out POWs to Free China (i.e. not occupied by the Japanese) and delivering aid to resistance groups. The willingness of Chinese Canadians to fight and if necessary die for Canada in the war changed public perceptions, and for the first time newspapers began to call for the repeal of the 1895 law which forbade all Asian Canadians to vote or hold offices. The Canadian historian Brereton Greenhous wrote of the efforts of the men of Force 136: "Several of them were decorated for their actions, and their service was a major factor in influencing the Canadian government to grant Chinese and Japanese Canadians full rights as Canadian citizens several years later".

Frank Wong of Vancouver who served with the Royal Canadian Electrical and Mechanical Engineers in Northwestern Europe in 1944-1945 recalled that his service with the Army was the first time he had been treated as an equal, stating: "They treated me just like an equal. You have your uniform, you're in it together; you eat together and you sleep together.". Like other Chinese Canadian veterans, Wong argued for equality of treatment, asking why he should be treated as a second-class citizen despite his war services. Wong stated his reasons for enlisting were: "I decided maybe if I joined the armed forces, after the war they would give me the right to vote". Peggy Lee of Toronto by contrast stated her reasons for enlisting in 1942 with the Women's Ambulance Corps was "do my bit" for Canada. Roy Mah who served with the SOE behind Japanese lines in Burma stated: "We thought that serving in the armed forces would be an opportunity for us to prove to the general public that we are loyal Canadians, that in time of need, they would see that we have no hesitation to don the King's uniform and go overseas to fight for our country, fight to preserve democracy." The Canadian historian Henry Yu stated about the efforts of Chinese-Canadian veterans: "They had to accept that they had fought this war—a good war in everyone's estimation—and they were still coming back to places built around white supremacy. So for some of them, they began vocally to argue: Why can't we vote still?"

Many Chinese Canadians argued that if Canada was fighting against not only Nazi Germany but her racist ideologies such as the Völkisch movement, then it was hypocritical for so many white Canadians to support attitudes of white supremacy back home. Chinese-Canadian veteran Frank Wong described the situation as being unable to “live outside Chinatown, and professional jobs were not available to [Chinese Canadians]. I wasn’t even allowed to go swimming in a public pool.” The contributions of Chinese Canadians toward the eventual allied victory did not spell an end to discrimination for them in Canada, although these attitudes did eventually start to dissipate. According to Chinese-Canadian veteran George Chow, after being treated “like a second-class citizen” in youth, during his service he was treated “just like an equal", elaborating on his service as such: “you have your uniform, you’re in it together; you eat together and you sleep together." Catherine Clement, the curator of Chinese Canadian Military Museum in Vancouver stated: "It's called a double victory because they not only helped Canada win the war, but they also helped propel the civil rights movement for the Chinese-Canadians."

Canada was slow to lift the restrictions against the Chinese Canadians and grant them full rights as Canadian citizens. Because Canada signed the United Nations Charter of Human Rights at the conclusion of the Second World War, the Canadian government had to repeal the Chinese Exclusion Act, which contravened the UN Charter. The same year, 1947, Chinese Canadians were finally granted the right to vote in federal elections. Prime Minister William Lyon Mackenzie King was opposed to granting the franchise to Chinese Canadians, but Chinese-Canadian veterans led a coalition of churches, unions, civic groups and veterans' associations into pressuring the King government to end the exclusion of Chinese Canadians from the franchise. Friedman stated about Chinese-Canadian enfranchisement: "Canada has this great spot on the world stage—as just, fair and level-headed country—but the reason it is that way is because Chinese residents forced that issue and made it more just." One Second World War veteran, Ronald Lee, remembered when he learned that Chinese Canadians could now vote together with repeal of the Exclusion Act: "Down in Chinatown, we celebrated because we were Canadians! We were able to bring our families from China. It was quite the jubilation." Arguing that it was unjust to discriminate against veterans, professions such as the law, medicine and engineering were opened for Chinese Canadians for the first time after 1945.However, it took another 20 years, until the points system was adopted for selecting immigrants, for the Chinese to begin to be admitted under the same criteria as any other applicants. In the 1957 election, the Second World War veteran Douglas Jung was elected as a Progressive Conservative for the riding of Vancouver Centre, becoming the first Chinese Canadian elected to the House of Commons. Jung's election, which proved that white voters would vote for a Chinese Canadian, marked the beginning of a trend where Chinese Canadians cease to depend upon the Benevolent Associations to negotiate with the politicians and instead Chinese Canadians became politically active themselves. After many years of organized calls for an official Canadian government public apology and redress to the historic Head tax, the minority Conservative government of Stephen Harper announced, as part of their pre-election campaign, an official apology. On June 22, 2006, Prime Minister Stephen Harper delivered a message of redress in the House of Commons, calling it a "grave injustice".

Some educated Chinese arrived in Canada during the war as refugees. Since the mid-20th century, most new Chinese Canadians come from university-educated families, who of still consider quality education an essential value. These newcomers are a major part of the "brain gain", the inverse of the infamous "brain drain", i.e., the occurrence of many Canadians leaving to the United States, of which Chinese have also been a part.

Late 20th century 
From 1947 to the early 1970s, Chinese immigrants to Canada came mostly from Hong Kong, Taiwan, or Southeast Asia. Chinese from the mainland who were eligible in the family reunification program had to visit the Canadian High Commission in Hong Kong, since Canada and the PRC did not have diplomatic relations until 1970. From the late 1980s, an influx of Taiwanese people immigrated to Canada forming a group of Taiwanese Canadians. They settled in areas such as Vancouver, British Columbia and to the adjacent cities of Burnaby, Richmond and Coquitlam. There was a significant influx of wealthy Chinese entrepreneurs from Hong Kong in the early and mid-1990s before the handover of Hong Kong to the People's Republic of China (PRC). Canada was a preferred location, in part because investment visas were significantly easier to obtain than visas to the United States. Vancouver, Richmond and Toronto were the major destinations of these Chinese. During those years, immigrants from Hong Kong alone made up to 46% of all Chinese immigrants to Canada. After 1997, a significant portion of Chinese immigrants chose to move back to Hong Kong, some of a more permanent nature, after the dust of the handover was settled and fears of a "Communist takeover" turned out to be unnecessary.

Starting in the late 20th century, Chinese Canadians have become active in the cultural scene in Canada, with  the writers such Larissa Lai, Evelyn Lau,  Denise Chong, Wayson Choy, Paul Yee, Jim Wong-Chu, and Vincent Lam all winning acclaim. In the world of film-making, Christina Wong, William Dere, Colleen Leung, Richard Fung, Dora Nipp, Tony Chan, Yung Chang Julia Kwan, Karin Lee, Mina Shum, Michelle Wong, Paul Wong, and Keith Lock have worked as directors and/or as script writers. The Confucian tradition emphasizing hard work, scholarship, self-discipline and learning has meant the Chinese Canadians families have strongly aspired for higher education and the 2001 census reported that over a quarter of Chinese Canadians had a university degree. As it was the Liberal government of Lester Pearson that liberalized the immigration system in 1967, Chinese Canadians tended to vote for the Liberals in the late 20th and early 21st centuries. In 1993, Raymond Chan became the first Chinese Canadian cabinet minister, and in 1999, Adrienne Clarkson became the first Chinese Canadian governor general.

21st century 
In the 21st century, Chinese immigration from Hong Kong has dropped sharply and the largest source of Chinese immigration are now from the mainland China. A smaller number have arrived from Taiwan and very small numbers from Fiji, French Polynesia, and New Zealand. Today, mainland China has taken over from Hong Kong and Taiwan as the largest source of Chinese immigration. The PRC has also taken over from all countries and regions as the country sending the most immigrants to Canada. According to the 2002 statistics from the Citizenship and Immigration Canada, the PRC has supplied the biggest number of Canadian immigrants since 2000, averaging well over 30,000 immigrants per year, totalling an average of 15% of all immigrants to Canada. This trend shows no sign of slowing down, with an all-time high of more than 40,000 reached in 2005. According to 2006 census, 70% of Chinese Canadians live either in the greater Vancouver area or the greater Toronto area.

On June 22, 2006, Prime Minister Stephen Harper delivered a message of redress in the House of Commons, offering an apology in Cantonese and compensation for the head tax once paid by Chinese immigrants. Survivors or their spouses will be paid approximately $20,000 CAD in compensation.

In December 2008, the Philippines passed China as Canada's leading source of immigrants. In 2010, when Mainland China became the second largest economy in the world after the United States, its economic growth sparked even greater immigration opportunities to mainland Chinese. A 2011 survey shown that 60% of Chinese millionaires plan to immigrate, where 37% of the respondents wanted to immigrate to Canada. Many foreign countries such as Canada hold very large attraction for rich Chinese, because of their better social welfare system, higher quality of education and a greater opportunity for investment. The main reasons Chinese businesspeople want to move abroad was for some educational opportunities for their children, advanced medical treatment, worsening pollution back home (especially urban air quality) and food safety concerns. The Canadian Federal Investor Immigrant Program (FIIP) as a cash-for-visa scheme allows many powerful Chinese to seek for a Canadian citizenship, and recent reports show that 697 of the 700 (99.6%) of the applicants to this visa in 2011 were mainland Chinese. However, Canada—along with other English-speaking countries such as the United States and Australia—has increased its immigration requirements, forcing Chinese millionaires to seek permanent residency elsewhere.

Demographics

At the turn of the 20th century, the Chinese population in Canada was 17,312. From the years 1988 to 1993, 166,487 Hong Kong immigrants had settled in Canada.

In 2001, 25% of Chinese in Canada were Canadian-born.
During the same year, the Chinese population stood at 1,094,700 accounted for 3.5% of Canada's total population. By 2006 the population stood at 1,346,510 comprising 4.3% of the Canadian population. StatsCan projects by 2031, the Chinese Canadian population is projected to reach between 2.4 and 3.0 million, constituting approximately 6 percent of the Canadian population. Much of the growth will be bolstered by sustained immigration as well as creating a younger age structure.

During the 2011 census in Canada, it was estimated that 1,324,700 individuals of pure Chinese origin resided in Canada. This number increased to 1,487,000 individuals, when including those of both pure Chinese origin and people of partial Chinese ancestry (meaning, individuals with both Chinese and some other racial and ethnic origin) during the 2011 census in Canada.

Most of the Chinese Canadian community is concentrated within the provinces of British Columbia and Ontario. The five metropolitan areas with the largest Chinese-Canadian populations are the Greater Toronto Area (631,050), Metro Vancouver (474,655), Greater Montreal (89,400), Calgary Region (89,675) and the Edmonton Metropolitan Region (60,200). The Chinese are the largest visible minority group in Alberta and British Columbia, and are the second largest in Ontario.  The highest concentration of Chinese Canadians is in Vancouver and Richmond (British Columbia), where they constitute the largest ethnic group by country, and one in five residents are Chinese.

The province of Saskatchewan has a growing Chinese community, at over one percent as of 2006, mainly in the city of Saskatoon (2.1%), the province's largest city, and to a lesser extent, Regina (1.9%), the capital of the province. The Riversdale neighbourhood of Saskatoon has a historical Chinese settlement dating back to the early 1900s, where Chinese immigrants were employed by the Grand Trunk Pacific Railway, and established businesses within this district. Riversdale is currently home to many Chinese restaurants and stores. Chinese are the largest visible minority group in Saskatchewan.

The Chinese Canadian population stood at 1.4 million in 2011, according to Statistics Canada in that year's census.

The Chinese Canadian community stood at 1.71 million, or 4.63% of the Canadian population, in the 2021 Canadian census.

Geographical distribution 
Data from this section from Statistics Canada, 2021.

Provinces & territories 

Canadian metropolitan areas with large Chinese populations:

Language

In 2001, 87% of Chinese reported having a conversational knowledge of at least one official language, while 15% reported that they could speak neither English nor French. Of those who could not speak an official language, 50% immigrated to Canada in the 1990s, while 22% immigrated in the 1980s. These immigrants tended to be in the older age groups. Of prime working-age Chinese immigrants, 89% reported knowing at least one official language.

In 2001, collectively, the varieties of Chinese are the third-most common reported mother tongue, after English and French. 3% of the Canadian population, or 872,000 people, reported the Chinese language as their mother tongue—the language that they learned as a child and still understand. The most common Chinese mother tongue is Cantonese. Of these people, 44% were born in Hong Kong, 27% were born in Guangdong Province in China, and 18% were Canadian-born. The second-most common reported Chinese mother tongue was Mandarin. Of these people, 85% were born in either Mainland China or Taiwan, 7% were Canadian-born, and 2% were born in Malaysia. However, only about 790,500 people reported speaking Chinese at home on a regular basis, 81,900 fewer than those who reported having a Chinese mother tongue. This suggests some language loss has occurred, mainly among the Canadian-born who learned Chinese as a child, but who may not speak it regularly or do not use it as their main language at home.

Census data
Some varieties may be underreported due to respondents simply responding "Chinese" rather than specifying:

Immigration

As of 2001, almost 75% of the Chinese population in Canada lived in either Vancouver or Toronto. The Chinese population was 17% in Vancouver and 9% in Toronto. More than 50% of the Chinese immigrants who just arrived in 2000/2001 reported that their reason for settling in a given region was because their family and friends already lived there.

The economic growth of mainland China since the turn of the 21st century has sparked even greater emigration opportunities for mainland Chinese. A 2011 survey showed that 60% of Chinese millionaires planned to emigrate, where 37% of the respondents wanted to emigrate to Canada. The main reasons Chinese businesspeople wanted to move abroad was for greater educational opportunities for their children, advanced medical treatment, worsening pollution back home (especially urban air quality), concerns of political instability and food safety concerns. The Canadian Immigrant Investor Program (CANIIP) allows many powerful Chinese to qualify for Canadian citizenship: among the 700 applicants to this program in 2011, 697 (99.6%) were mainland Chinese. In addition, many Chinese immigrants to Canada apply through the provincial nominee program, which requires immigrants to invest in a business in the province in which they settle.

Socioeconomics
In 2001, 31% of Chinese in Canada, both foreign-born and Canadian-born, had a university education, compared with the national average of 18%.

Of prime working-age Chinese in Canada, about 20% were in sales and services; 20% in business, finance, and administration; 16% in natural and applied sciences; 13% in management; and 11% in processing, manufacturing, and utilities. However, there is a trend that Chinese move toward small towns and rural areas for agricultural and agri-food operations in recent years.

Chinese who immigrated to Canada in the 1990s and were of prime working-age in 2001 had an employment rate of 61%, which was lower than the national average of 80%. Many reported that the recognition of foreign qualifications was a major issue. However, the employment rate for Canadian-born Chinese men of prime working-age was 86%, the same as the national average. The employment rate for Canadian-born Chinese women of prime working-age was 83%, which was higher than the national average of 76%.

Religion

Generational differences are also evident regarding religious practice and affiliation within this population group.

Among Toronto's early Chinese immigrants especially, the church body was an important structure serving as a meeting place, hall and leisure club. Even today, over 30 churches in Toronto continue to hold Chinese congregations.

Christianity reached its peak of popularity in the early 1960s, with the 1961 census still reporting that 60% of the Chinese declared themselves Christians. Over the following 40 years Christianity has been steadily declining both among Canadian-born Chinese and new immigrants. Religiousy, the Chinese-Canadian community is different from the broader Canadian population in that about half of Chinese Canadians reportedly practise Chinese folk religion.

In 2001, 56% of Chinese Canadians aged 15 and over said that they did not have any religious affiliation, compared with the national average of 17%. As a result, Chinese Canadians make up 13% of all Canadians who did not report a religious affiliation despite making up 4% of the population. Among Chinese Canadians, 14% were Buddhist, 14% were Catholic and 9% belonged to a Protestant denomination.

Media
Canadians of Chinese origin have established a presence in the Canadian media scene spearheading several Chinese language media outlets in Canada.

According to Mei Duzhe of the Jamestown Foundation in 2001 and Sarah Cook of the Center for International Media Assistance in 2013, Ming Pao, Sing Tao Daily and World Journal have been under the influence of the Chinese Communist Party. Conversely, Jason Q. Ng of China Digital Times and Citizen Lab considered World Journal in 2013 to be relatively critical of mainland China, and a 2019 Reuters Institute survey on selected media from Hong Kong listed Ming Pao and Sing Tao as respectively the 3rd and 6th most trusted outlets in the city.

Newspapers

 Ming Pao Daily News 
 Sing Tao Daily 
 The Epoch Times 
 Sept Days
 Today Daily News - now Today's Commercial News
 World Journal - Canadia edition ceased publication in 2016
 Oriental Weekly

Radio

 A1 Chinese Radio in Toronto
 CHMB in Vancouver
 Fairchild Radio CHKF-FM in Calgary
 Fairchild Radio CHKT and CIRV-FM in Toronto
 Fairchild Radio and CHKG-FM and CJVB in Vancouver

Television

 C Today TV in Toronto
 Fairchild TV across Canada
 Fairchild TV 2 HD across Canada
 LS Times TV across Canada
 New Tang Dynasty Television Canada
 Omni News across Canada
 Talentvision across Canada
 Talentvision 2 HD across Canada
 WOWtv across Canada

Cultural adjustment and assimilation
According to the Canadian Ethnic Diversity Survey conducted in 2002, 76% of Canadians of Chinese origin said they had a strong sense of belonging to Canada; at the same time, 58% said that they had a strong sense of belonging to their ethnic or cultural group. Canadians of Chinese origin are also active in Canadian society; 64% of Chinese Canadians who were eligible to vote reported doing so in the 2000 federal election, while 60% said they voted in the 1996 provincial election. About 35% reported that they had participated in an organization such as a sports team or community association in the 12 months preceding the survey. 34% of Canadians of Chinese origin also reported that they had experienced discrimination, prejudice, or unfair treatment based on their ethnicity, race, religion, language or accent in the past five years, or since they came to Canada. A majority of those who had experienced discrimination said that they felt it was based on their race or skin colour, while 42% that the discrimination took place at work or when applying for a job or promotion.

Most Canadian-born Chinese during the 1970s and 1980s were descended from immigrants of Hong Kong and Southern China, while more recent Canadian-born Chinese come from mainland Chinese immigrants. Most Chinese Canadians born in Canada who have assimilated into Canadian society identify as solely Canadian while those born overseas and immigrated to Canada later in life primarily identify as a mixture of both Chinese and Canadian. In Canada, strong feelings of ethnic heritage are bolstered by the clustering of immigrant communities in large urban centres, especially because new immigrants tend to associate almost exclusively with people of the same culture due to unfamiliarity to the new mainstream culture. Canadians of Chinese origin, particularly the second generation and beyond, tend to have more liberal and Western style beliefs.

Notable Chinese Canadians

See also

 Anti-Oriental riots (Vancouver)
 Canada–China relations
 Canadian Chinese cuisine
 Chinatowns in Toronto (First Chinatown, West Chinatown & East Chinatown)
 Chinatown, Vancouver
 Chinese Canadian National Council
 Chinese Canadians in British Columbia
 Chinese Canadians in the Greater Toronto Area
 Chinese Canadians in Greater Vancouver
 Chinese head tax in Canada
 Chinese Immigration Act of 1885
 Chinese Immigration Act, 1923
 Fo Guang Shan Temple, Toronto
 Historical Chinatowns in Nanaimo & Chinatown, Victoria 
 History of Chinese immigration to Canada
 International Buddhist Temple
 Ling Yen Mountain Temple
 Royal Commission on Chinese Immigration (1885)
 Taoist Tai Chi Society (Fung Loy Kok Institute of Taoism)
 Vancouver anti-Chinese riots, 1886
 Hong Kong Canadians
 Taiwanese Canadians
 Lost Years: A People's Struggle for Justice

References

Sources
 Pon, Gordon. "Antiracism in the Cosmopolis: Race, Class, and Gender in the Lives of Elite Chinese Canadian Women", Social Justice, vol. 32 (4): pp. 161–179 (2005)
 Lindsay, Colin. The Chinese Community in Canada, Profiles of Ethnic Communities in Canada, 2001, Social and Aboriginal Statistics Division, Statistics Canada, Catalog #89-621-XIE
 Li, Peter S. "Chinese". Encyclopedia of Canada's Peoples (Toronto: Multicultural History Society of Ontario, 1999).

Further reading

 
 Chao, Lien. (1997) Beyond Silence: Chinese Canadian Literature in English (Tsar Publications, 1997)
 Chen, William Y. (University of Saskatchewan Library Cataloger of Far Eastern Materials). "The Chinese in Canada: A Select Bibliography". 'The Chinese in Canada. p. 165-173.
 Guo, Shibao, and Don J. DeVoretz. (2006) "The changing face of Chinese immigrants in Canada." Journal of International Migration and Integration/Revue de l'integration et de la migration internationale (2006) 7#3: 275-300.
 
 
 Lai, David Chuenyan. (2007) Chinatowns: Towns within cities in Canada (UBC Press, 2007).
 
 Li, Xiaoping. (2011) Voices rising: Asian Canadian cultural activism (UBC Press, 2011)
 
 
 
 Wickberg, Edgar, ed. (1982) From China to Canada: A history of the Chinese communities in Canada (McClelland and Stewart, 1982).
 
 Yee, Paul. (2006) Saltwater City: An illustrated history of the Chinese in Vancouver (Douglas & McIntyre, 2006)

External links

 Chinese Canadian Genealogy  at the Vancouver Public Library
 Chinese-Canadians: Profiles from a Community - Vancouver Public Library wiki
 Historic Chinese Language Materials in British Columbia (加華文獻聚珍)
 Multicultural Canada website
 History of the Early Chinese Canadians (Library and Archives Canada)
 Richard Charles Lee Canada-Hong Kong Library 利銘澤典宬 at the University of Toronto
 Chinese Canadian Archive at Toronto Public Library

 Lost Years: A People's Struggle for Justice - International Award-Winning epic documentary on the Chinese Canadian Community
 Asian Canadian Community-Chinese
 Chinese Canadian Stories at the University of British Columbia
 Chinese Canadian National Council
 Chinese Canadian Historical Society of British Columbia Chinese Canadian Women, 1923-1967 - MHSO
 Overview of Chinese Canadian History
 Chinese Canadian Women
 History of Chinese in Canada
 History of the Chinese Head Tax & Exclusion Act
  National Film Board - Documentary "In The Shadow of Gold Mountain", detailing the history of abuse against Chinese Canadians
 CBC Digital Archives - A Tale of Perseverance: Chinese Immigration to Canada
 Timeline of Important Events in the History of the Chinese in Canada
 100 influential Chinese Canadians in British Columbia (October 2006)
 Alphabetical List of Persons: A to L, Alphabetical List of Persons: L to S Alphabetical List of Persons, S to Z

Asian Canadian

Chinese Canadian
Canadian
Ethnic groups in Canada
East Asian Canadian